James Rankin Norvell (September 24, 1902 – October 21, 1969) was a justice of the Supreme Court of Texas from January 1, 1957 to October 10, 1968.

References

Justices of the Texas Supreme Court
1902 births
1969 deaths
20th-century American judges